St Mary le Strand is a Church of England church at the eastern end of the Strand in the City of Westminster, London. It lies within the Deanery of Westminster (St Margaret) within the Diocese of London.  The church stands on what was until recently a traffic island to the north of Somerset House, King's College London's Strand campus, and south of Bush House (formerly the headquarters of the BBC World Service and now also part of King's College London). It is the official church of the Women's Royal Naval Service, and has a book of remembrance for members who have died in service. The nearest tube station is Temple, with the now-closed Aldwych station nearly opposite the church. It is known as one of the two 'Island Churches', the other being St Clement Danes.

History
The church is the second to have been called St Mary le Strand, the first having been situated a short distance to the south. The date of its foundation is unclear but it was mentioned in a judgment of 1222, when it was called the Church of the Innocents, or St Mary and the Innocents. It was pulled down in 1549 by Edward Seymour, 1st Duke of Somerset, to make way for Somerset House. The parishioners were promised a new church, which was never built, forcing them to move to the nearby church of St Clement Danes and afterwards to the Savoy Chapel. The site now occupied by the modern church was formerly occupied by a great maypole which had been the scene of May Day festivities in the 16th and 17th century but was severely decayed by the early 18th century.

The new St Mary le Strand was the first of the twelve new churches built in London under the Commission for Building Fifty New Churches, at a cost of some £16,000. Construction began in February 1714 under the architect James Gibbs, being his first major project following his return from Italy. The steeple was completed in September 1717, but the church was not consecrated for use until 1 January 1724, by Edmund Gibson, Bishop of London, when the Rev. John Heylyn became first rector of the rebuilt church. Bonnie Prince Charlie is alleged to have renounced his Roman Catholic faith in the church to become an Anglican during a secret visit to London in 1750. John Dickens and Elizabeth Barrow, the parents of Charles Dickens, were married here in 1809.

The church narrowly escaped destruction twice during the 20th century. At the start of the 20th century the London County Council proposed to demolish the church to widen the Strand; a campaign involving the artist Walter Crane succeeded in averting this, although the graveyard was obliterated and the graves moved to Brookwood Cemetery. The London Blitz of the Second World War caused much damage to the surrounding area but again the church avoided destruction, though it did suffer damage from a nearby bomb explosion.

Architecture
The architecture of St Mary le Strand proved controversial from the outset, and the architect later expressed unhappiness at the way that his plans had been altered by the Commissioners. According to Gibbs, the church was originally intended to be an Italianate structure with a small campanile over the west end and no steeple. Instead of the latter, a column 250 feet (76 m) high surmounted with a statue of Queen Anne was to have been erected a short distance to the west of the church. A great quantity of stone was purchased and brought to the spot, but the plan was abandoned on the death of the queen in 1714. Instead, the architect was ordered to reuse the stone to build a steeple, which fundamentally altered the plan of the church. Gibbs explained:

The extravagant Baroque ornamentation of the exterior was criticised at the time, and matters were not helped when one of the decorative urns surmounting the exterior of the church fell off and killed a passer-by during a procession in 1802. The prominent situation of the church has also been problematic; even in the 18th century, parishioners complained of the traffic noise. As such, Gibbs designed the ground floor without windows as to keep the noise of traffic out.

Even so, the church – Gibbs' first public building – won him considerable fame. The interior of the structure is richly decorated with a plastered ceiling in white and gold, with a ceiling inspired by Luigi Fontana's work in the church of Santi Apostoli and Pietro da Cortona's Santi Luca e Martina, both in Rome. The porch was inspired by Cortona's Santa Maria della Pace. The walls were influenced by Michelangelo and the steeple shows the influence of Sir Christopher Wren.

Rectors of St Mary le Strand

1724–1759† John Heylyn
1759–1761 Charles Tarrant (later Dean of Carlisle then Peterborough)
1761–1777 Charles Bertie
1777–1780† John William Hopkins
1781–1812† James Robinson Hayward
1813–1839† James Edward Gambier
1839–1861† Joshua Frederick Denham
1861–1878† Alfred Bowen Evans
1878–1891 Lewen Tugwell
1891–1944† Frederick Harcourt Hillersdon (Mayor of Westminster 1909)
1944-1966 Bertram Francis Chambers
 Edward Thompson
 William Gulliford

† Rector died in post

See also

 List of churches and cathedrals of London

References

External links

 
 Hidden London
 Mystery Worshipper Report at the Ship of Fools website
 Deanery of Westminster (St Margaret)

Church of England church buildings in the City of Westminster
Churches completed in 1717
18th-century Church of England church buildings
Diocese of London
Grade I listed churches in the City of Westminster
James Gibbs buildings
English Baroque church buildings
Georgian architecture in the City of Westminster
Neoclassical architecture in London
1717 establishments in England
Strand, London
Neoclassical church buildings in England